Kurana is a municipal ward of Negombo, Sri Lanka. It is on the Negombo-Colombo Main road and is located a few miles from the Bandaranaike International Airport. People living in Kurana  belong to various nationalities and religions.

Rev. John Simon de Silva (1868-1940), the Methodist clergyman, temperance activist, journalist and nationalist was born in this village.

Vernon Corea's father, Reverend Canon Ivan Corea was a curate at St. Phillips Angalican Church in Kurana, Katunayake at the time of his birth in 1927.

Populated places in Western Province, Sri Lanka